Los Chicos are a Spanish rock band formed in 2000. They are not related to an earlier Spanish band active from 1978 to 1982.

Albums
 Shakin' and Prayin 2003
 Fat Spark 2005 
 Launching Rockets 2007
 We Sound Amazing but We Look like Shit 2009
 10 years of Shakin' Fat and Launching Shit Compilation
 In the Age of Stupidity 2013

References

External links
Blog de Los Chicos
Los Chicos en bandcamp
Los Chicos en facebook

Spanish musical groups